Ramapada Chowdhury (28 December 1922 – 29 July 2018) was an Indian novelist and short story writer in Bengali. For his novel Bari Badle Jay, he received the Sahitya Akademi Award in 1988. He was also a recipient of the Rabindra Puraskar and several other awards. He won the Rabindranath Tagore Memorial International Prize in its inaugural year. Many of his works have been adapted into films, including the multiple-award-winning Kharij, directed by Mrinal Sen, and Ek Doctor Ki Maut, directed by Tapan Sinha. Chowdhury started writing during the Second World War. He was associated with Anandabazar Patrika for many years, and edited its Sunday supplement. His novels are marked by an economy of expression. He is one of the most well known short story writers in contemporary Bengali literature.

Early life
Ramapada Chowdhury was born on 28 December 1922 in Kharagpur, Bengal Presidency, British India (now in the Indian state of West Bengal). His father, Maheshchandra Chowdhury, worked in the railways, and the family often moved from one place to another. Thus young Ramapada was exposed to life in several different parts of India. Ranchi, Raipur, Bilaspur, Guwahati and Dibrugarh were some of the towns he lived in. All of these places figure in his early works of fiction. His Mother was Durgasundari Devi. He completed his schooling from Kharagpur. Subsequently, he studied at Presidency College, Calcutta, and obtained his master's degree in English literature from the University of Calcutta.

Career
Chowdhury wrote his first short story as a student, in response to a challenge from his friends. It was written sitting in a restaurant near his college, and was published in the newspaper Jugantar. After completing his Master's, he got a job with Anandabazar Patrika. Later he became Associate Editor of the newspaper, and edited its Sunday supplement Rabibasariya for many years.

Chowdhury started writing short stories on a regular basis from the age of twenty-five. He published two collections of stories before the publication of his first novel Pratham Prahar (1954). Although an established writer in the 1950s, Chowdhury received wider recognition with his 1960 novel Banpalashir Padabali, which appeared in serial form in the well-known literary magazine Desh. He was awarded the Rabindra Puraskar in 1971 for his novel Ekhoni and the Sahitya Akademi Award in 1988 for Bari Badle Jay. In all, he wrote around fifty novels and over one hundred short stories. He also edited an anthology of stories originally published in Desh. According to Shamik Ghosh, Chowdhury was among the few Bengali authors who preferred quality to quantity.

In 2011, the Indian Institute of Planning and Management instituted the Rabindranath Tagore Memorial International Prize. Ramapada Chowdhury won the award in its inaugural year, for his novel Banpalashir Padabali. According to writer and scholar Surajit Dasgupta, 

The Sahitya Akademi, in its series of films on eminent Indian writers, has produced a film on Ramapada Chowdhury, directed by Raja Mitra.

Selected works
 Pratham Prahar (1954)
 Dwiper Nam Tia rang (1958) Banpalashir Padabali (1960)
 Parajit Samrat (1966)
 Ekhoni (1969)
 Picnic (1970)
 Je Jekhane Danriye (1972) Album-e Koyekti Chobi (1973)
 Kharij (1974) Lajja (1975)
 Hridoy (1976)
 Beej (1977)
 Swajan (1981)
 Bari Badle Jay (1988)
 Abhimanyu (1982)
 Darbari Lalbai Harano KhataBahiri
Chhad
Shesher Seemana
Aakash Pradeep
Bhobishyot

English translations
 Nothing but the Truth (original title Kharij), translated by Enakshi Chatterjee, Vikas, New Delhi, 1978. .
 Second Encounter (original title Je Jekhane Danriye), translated by Swapna Dutta, Niyogi Books, 2016. .

Films based on Ramapada Chowdhury's works
 Dwiper Nam Tiarang (1963), directed by Gurudas Bagchi
 Ekhoni (1970), directed by Tapan Sinha
 Picnic (1972), directed by Inder Sen
 Banpalashir Padabali (1973), directed by Uttam Kumar
 Je Jekhane Danriye (1974), directed by Agragami
 Kharij (1982), directed by Mrinal Sen
 Ek Din Achanak (1989) (in Hindi), directed by Mrinal Sen (based on Beej))
 Ek Doctor Ki Maut (1992) (in Hindi), directed by Tapan Sinha (based on Abhimanyu)
 Sundari (1999), directed by Gul Bahar Singh (based on the short story Ahlaadi))
 Borunbabur Bondhu (2020), directed by Anik Dutta (based on Chhad)

Awards and honours 
 Sahitya Akademi Award 1988
 Rabindra Puraskar 1971
 Ananda Puraskar 1963
 Rabindranath Tagore Memorial International Prize 2011

References

External links

Ramapada Chowdhury – A Short Documentary Film – Sahitya Akademi

1922 births
2018 deaths
20th-century Bengalis
19th-century Bengalis
Bengali novelists
Bengali Hindus
Writers from Kolkata
Bengali-language writers
University of Calcutta alumni
Recipients of the Ananda Purashkar
Recipients of the Sahitya Akademi Award in Bengali
Indian novelists
Indian journalists
Indian short story writers
Indian writers
Indian male novelists
Indian male short story writers
Indian male writers
Indian columnists
Indian editors
Indian newspaper editors
Indian newspaper journalists
20th-century Indian writers
20th-century Indian male writers
20th-century Indian journalists
20th-century Indian short story writers
20th-century Indian novelists
Novelists from West Bengal
People from Kharagpur